Vernon Akitt Brown (23 March 1905–28 January 1965) was a New Zealand architect and university lecturer. He was born in Liverpool, Lancashire, England on 23 March 1905 and educated at Highgate School.

References

1905 births
1965 deaths
People educated at Highgate School
New Zealand educators
New Zealand academics
British emigrants to New Zealand
Architects from Liverpool
20th-century New Zealand architects